2010 Ulster Rally incorporating Rally Northern Ireland was held between 20–21 August 2010. The Rally HQ located in Antrim, Co Antrim, Northern Ireland and organised by the Northern Ireland Motor Club (NIMC) The 2010 Ulster Rally was the fifth round of the 2010 MSA British Rally Championship and the sixth round of the 2010 MSA British Historic Rally Championship.

Special Stages

Rally Northern Ireland

Final Classification

Retirements 
Rally Northern Ireland
  Gwyndaf Evans/Phil Pugh (Mitsubishi Lancer Evo X) – Engine (SS11);
  Molly Taylor/Coral Taylor (Citroën C2 R2 Max) – Accident (SS8);
  Dave Weston_Jnr/Ieuan Thomas (Subaru Impreza N2010) – Accident (SS1);
  Jarkko Nikara/Petri Nikara (Renault Twingo) – Accident (SS10);
  Mikko Pajunen/Janne Perälä (Suzuki Swift) – Accident (SS8);
  Robert Barrable/Damien Connolly (Citroën C2 R2 Max) – Lost Wheel (SS7);

2010 British Rally Championship Drivers' championship (after 5 rounds of 6)

Sources

External links
Official Website

2010 in Northern Ireland sport
2010 British Rally Championship season